STARS-EC (Space Tethered Autonomous Robotic Satellite Elevator of CubeSat, COSPAR 1998-067SE, SATCAT 47928) was a nanosatellite developed by Shizuoka University, for the purpose of demonstrating space elevator tether technology. It was a 3U-size CubeSat, and could split into three separate satellites, connected via tethers. STARS-EC was launched on 20 February 2021, and was deployed from the International Space Station (ISS). The deployment service of STARS-EC was provided by Mitsui Bussan Aerospace.

The satellite decayed from orbit on 15 April 2022.

Mission
STARS-EC's mission was to demonstrate space elevator tether technology using a 3U CubeSat. After deployment from the ISS, the satellite split into three separate spacecraft, each the size of a 1U CubeSat. The spacecraft on each end was connected to the center satellite by an  space tether, thus putting the satellites on the ends 22 m apart from one another. The satellite in the center moved back and forth along the tether, demonstrating the orbital space elevator technology. Each spacecraft was equipped with a camera to monitor the elevator demonstration.

See also
 STARS
 STARS-II
 STARS-C
 OPUSAT-II
 RSP-01
 WARP-01

References

External links
 Official project site 
 STARS Space Service

Space elevator
Satellites of Japan
2021 in Japan
Spacecraft launched in 2021
Spacecraft which reentered in 2022
Satellites deployed from the International Space Station